Chlorethe is a genus of beetles in the family Cerambycidae, containing the following species:

 Chlorethe brachyptera Zajciw, 1963
 Chlorethe ingae Bates, 1867
 Chlorethe lalannecassoui Dalens, Tavakilian, & Touroult, 2010
 Chlorethe scabrosa Zajciw, 1963

References

Compsocerini